Whitmore High School is a co-educational secondary school situated in Barry, Wales.

History
Whitmore High School was formed in September 2018 during a reform of secondary education in the area, when the single-sex Bryn Hafren Comprehensive School and Barry Comprehensive School became co-educational schools. Whitmore High School was based out of the Barry Comprehensive School site.

In 2018, plans to build a new building for the school were announced, with construction started in September 2019. Staff and students moved into the new school building in May 2021.

References

External links
School Website

Secondary schools in the Vale of Glamorgan